Lomas is a territorial surname of English origin, derived from the hamlet of Lumhalghs, near Bury, Greater Manchester, and meaning "pool nook or recess". Notable people with the surname include:

Arts and entertainment  

Andrew Robert lomas born Yorkshire 1960-present  one of the original skateboarders in Great Britain  

Andy Lomas (born 1967), British digital artist
Carmen Lomas Garza (born 1948), Mexican American artist
Eric Lomas (born 1983), British Austrian theatre director
Herbert Lomas (actor) (1887–1931), British actor
Herbert Lomas (poet) (1924–2011), British poet and translator
James Lomas (actor) (born 1990), English stage actor
Jamie Lomas (born 1975), English actor
Kym Lomas (born 1976), English actress and former singer
Stanley Lomas (1913–2003), American television producer

Politics  
Alf Lomas (born 1928), British politician
Kenneth Lomas (1922–2000), British Labour Party politician

Sport 
Anne Lomas (born 1953), New Zealand lawn bowls competitor
Arthur Lomas (1895–1924), New Zealand cricketer
Bill Lomas (1928–2007), British motorcycle racer
Billy Lomas (1885–1976), British footballer
Bryan Nickson Lomas (born 1990), Malaysian diver
Claire Lomas (born 1980), British campaigner, fundraiser and former event rider
Harry Lomas (born 1903), English amateur footballer
James Lomas (rugby league) (1879–1960), English rugby league footballer
Jamie Lomas (footballer) (born 1977), English footballer
John Lomas (cricketer) (1917–1945), English cricketer
Jonathan Lomas (born 1968), English golfer
Lisa Lomas (born 1967), British table tennis player
Mark Lomas (born 1948), American football defensive lineman
Mark Lomas (cricketer) (born 1970), English cricketer
Steve Lomas (born 1974), Northern Irish professional football player
Tony Lomas (born 1945), British former motorcycle speedway rider

Other  
John Lomas (trade unionist) (1848–1933), New Zealand coalminer, trade unionist and public servant
Jonathan Lomas (researcher) (born 1952), British-Canadian health researcher
J. Keith Lomas, British businessman
Robert Lomas, British writer on Freemasonry and academic
Josh Lomas, Developer at Platfarm

English-language surnames